Owen Franklin Scheetz (December 24, 1913 – September 28, 1994) was an American professional baseball pitcher who appeared in six games with the Washington Senators of Major League Baseball during the 1943 season. A native of Baltic, Ohio, Scheetz played professionally for 13 seasons (1935–47) and won 137 games in minor league baseball.

All of Scheetz' six games pitched for Washington came in a relief role during the opening weeks of the wartime  season. He worked in nine full innings pitched, allowed 16 hits, four bases on balls, and seven runs, all of them earned, for an ERA of 7.00. He fanned five and earned no decisions. In the last wartime baseball season, 1945, Scheetz led the American Association with 19 victories (losing eight decisions), and compiled an ERA of 1.95.

References

External links

1913 births
1994 deaths
Baseball players from Ohio
Danville Leafs players
Hazleton Red Sox players
Little Rock Travelers players
Louisville Colonels (minor league) managers
Louisville Colonels (minor league) players
Major League Baseball pitchers
Milwaukee Brewers (minor league) players
Minneapolis Millers (baseball) players
People from Tuscarawas County, Ohio
Rocky Mount Red Sox players
Scranton Red Sox players
Washington Senators (1901–1960) players